Government Polytechnic Khutri, is a polytechnic in the state of Jharkhand, India, inaugurated by then Chief Minister of Bihar Pt. Bindeshwari Dubey on 2 April 1986. It is approved by the All India Council for Technical Education. Government Polytechnic Khutri is an Autonomous Institute of State Board of Technical Education, Jharkhand, offering three-years diploma programs in engineering and technology. AICTE and Government of Jharkhand approved full-time programs are offered to candidates selected through entrance exams conducted by the government of Jharkhand. The polytechnic also maintains relations with accreditation bodies like All India Council for Technical Education (AICTE) and Jharkhand State Board Of Technical Education (JSBTE).

It is located about 14 km away from Bokaro Steel City, near Jainamore.

Programs offered
Diploma Courses (duration: three years) 
Automobile Engineering.
Computer Science & Engineering.
Mechanical Engineering.

References

External links 
 Government Polytechnic Website

Engineering colleges in Jharkhand
1986 establishments in India
Educational institutions established in 1986